Cortemilia is a comune (municipality) in the Province of Cuneo in the Italian region Piedmont, located about  southeast of Turin and about  northeast of Cuneo.

Cortemilia borders the following municipalities: Bergolo, Bosia, Castino, Perletto, Pezzolo Valle Uzzone, Serole, and Torre Bormida.

History

Prehistory and Roman age 
In the area surrounding the town were found some fragments of artefacts and tools dated back to the Palaeolithic and Neolithic age, like an ax's front. These evidences confirm the possible existence of "stations" (settlements more or less temporary) in the area where nowadays Cortemilia is situated from the sixth until the second millennium BC.

The original center of Cortemilia is probably of pre-Roman origins but It bloomed during the Roman administration. The importance of Cortemilian during the Roman time is proved by some tombstones found just next the town centre.

Inside the town's coat of arm the name of the town is displayed in Latin language "Cohors Aemilia", which, according to a highly accredited hypothesis, is referred is referred to the console Marco Emilio Scaurus. He was the creator of the track "Via Aemilia Scauri" that connected Luni Vada Sabatia (Savona) with Its hinterland.

Gastronomy 
Cortemilia is noted for production of one of the most famous types of hazelnut, the Tonda Gentile di Langa, awarded IGP status. Every August the town celebrates the Sagra della Nocciola (hazelnut fair).

Demographic evolution

References

Cities and towns in Piedmont